Partia Centrum was a centrist, moderately conservative political party in Poland. Established on 3 April 2004, its founding declaration proclaimed a "necessity to take immediate steps towards repairing the state and to radically change the style of politics." The party's platform could be described as centrist with evident references to the tradition of Solidarity and Catholic social teaching.

The party's founding members and leadership were mostly from the ranks of the defunct party Solidarity Electoral Action (AWS), which held the government between 1997 and 2001, and other conservative to centrist groups, with some coming from the more liberal Freedom Union (UW).

Religa was leading in opinion polls until July but he withdrew on September 2 and asked his supporters to vote for the liberal Donald Tusk, his party did not enter the Sejm in the 2005 early elections with its poll results not exceeding 5%.

The party was deregistered in 2008 after not filing its 2007 financial statements.

External links
Official page

2004 establishments in Poland
2008 disestablishments in Poland
Centrist parties in Poland
Catholic political parties
Conservative parties in Poland
Defunct political parties in Poland
Political parties disestablished in 2008
Political parties established in 2004